Daggaraga Dooranga is a 2011 Telugu-language romantic thriller film starring Sumanth, Vedhika and Sindhu Tolani. It was dubbed into Malayalam as Poovithal Azhaku (പൂവിതൾ അഴകു്), into Tamil as Poovodum Puyalodum, and into Hindi as Aatank Ki Jung.

Plot
Gowtham (Sumanth) is an ad filmmaker who creates an imaginary digital model for one of his projects. That model unexpectedly closely resembles a real life woman, Meenakshi (Vedhika), whose engagement gets canceled due to Gowtham's provocative ad. An angry Meenakshi decides take action on Gowtham and his ad agency.

She contacts her friend Zahreen (Sindhu Tolani), an investigative journalist to take action against Gowtham. Zahreen meanwhile  is on a dangerous mission, attempting to expose an impending terrorist attack. Zahreen hands over a DVD  containing details of the terrorists to Meenakshi before she gets killed.

The terrorists are now after Meenakshi for that DVD. Gowtham unexpectedly is caught in her predicament and tries  to protect her. Meenakshi and Gowtham, now on the run, are the only ones who can prevent this impending terrorist act.

Cast

 Sumanth as Gautam
 Vedhika as Meenakshi
Ranganath
 Brahmanandam as Johnny
 Sindhu Tolani as Zareena
 Pragathi
 Ahuti Prasad
 Ajay
 Ravi Prakash
 Krishna Bhagavan as Bhagawan
 Raghu Babu
 Satyam Rajesh
 Kondavalasa Lakshmana Rao
 Duvvasi Mohan

Critical reception
From rediff.com's review: On the whole, Daggaraga Dooranga is watchable. Sumanth and Vedhicka carry the film on their shoulders. The lead pair does a good job. Sumanth gives a fine performance and Vedhicka has a fairly substantial role and lives up to it.

References

External links
 

2011 films
2010s Telugu-language films
Films about terrorism in India
Films scored by Raghu Kunche